The Dufferin and Haldimand Rifles of Canada was an infantry regiment of the Non-Permanent Active Militia of the Canadian Militia and later the Canadian Army. The regiment was formed in 1936, when The Haldimand Rifles was Amalgamated with The Dufferin Rifles of Canada. In 1946, the regiment was converted from Infantry to Artillery and now forms part of the 56th Field Artillery Regiment, RCA.

Lineage

The Dufferin and Haldimand Rifles of Canada 

 Originated on 28 September 1866, in York, Ontario, as the 37th Haldimand Battalion of Rifles.
 Redesignated on 8 May 1900, as the 37th Regiment Haldimand Rifles.
 Redesignated on 1 May 1920, as The Haldimand Rifles.
 Amalgamated on 15 December 1936, with The Dufferin Rifles of Canada and C Company of the 3rd Machine Gun Battalion, CMGC (now The Argyll and Sutherland Highlanders of Canada (Princess Louise's)), and Redesignated as The Dufferin and Haldimand Rifles of Canada.
 Redesignated on 7 November 1940, as the 2nd (Reserve) Battalion, The Dufferin and Haldimand Rifles of Canada.
 Redesignated on 1 June 1945, as The Dufferin and Haldimand Rifles of Canada.
 Converted to Artillery on 1 April 1946, and Redesignated as the 56th Light Anti-Aircraft Regiment (Dufferin and Haldimand Rifles), RCA (now the 56th Field Artillery Regiment, RCA).

The Dufferin Rifles of Canada 

 Originated on 28 September 1866, in Brantford, Ontario, as the 38th Brant Battalion of Infantry.
 Redesignated on 30 November 1866, as the 38th Brant Battalion of Infantry.
 Redesignated on 24 March 1871, as the 38th Brant Battalion of Rifles.
 Redesignated on 3 July 1874, as the 38th Brant Battalion or Dufferin Rifles.
 Redesignated on 28 September 1883, as the 38th Battalion Dufferin Rifles of Canada.
 Redesignated on 8 May 1900, as the 38th Regiment Dufferin Rifles of Canada.
 Redesignated on 1 May 1920, as The Dufferin Rifles of Canada.
 Amalgamated on 15 December 1936, with The Haldimand Rifles and C Company of the 3rd Machine Gun Battalion, CMGC, and Redesignated as The Dufferin and Haldimand Rifles of Canada.

Perpetuations 

 4th Battalion (Central Ontario), CEF
 36th Battalion, CEF
 114th Battalion (Haldimand), CEF
 125th Battalion (1st Overseas Battalion of 38th Regiment Dufferin Rifles), CEF
 215th Battalion (2nd Overseas Battalion of 38th Regiment Dufferin Rifles), CEF

History

1936-1939 
As a direct result of the 1936 Canadian Militia Reorganization, The Dufferin and Haldimand Rifles of Canada was formed by the Amalgamation of The Haldimand Rifles, The Dufferin Rifles of Canada, and "C" Company of the 3rd Machine Gun Battalion, CMGC.

The Second World War 
On 24 May 1940, the regiment mobilized The Dufferin and Haldimand Rifles of Canada, CASF for active service. On 7 November 1941, the battalion was redesignated as the 1st Battalion, The Dufferin and Haldimand Rifles of Canada, CASF. The battalion served in Canada in a home defence role as part of the 17th Canadian Infantry Brigade, 7th Canadian Infantry Division. On 8 March 1945, the battalion was disbanded.

Organization

The Dufferin and Haldimand Rifles of Canada (15 December 1936) 

 Regimental Headquarters (Brantford, Ontario)
 HQ Company (Dunnville, ON)
 A Company (Brantford, ON)
 B Company (Brantford, ON)
 C Company (Paris, ON)
 D Company (Hagersville, ON)

Alliances 

 The King's Royal Rifle Corps (1936-1946)

Battle Honours 

 Ypres 1915, ‘17
 Gravenstafel
 St. Julien
 Festubert, 1915
 Mount Sorrel
 Somme, 1916
 Pozieres
 Flers-Courcelette
 Ancre Heights
 Arras 1917, '18
 Vimy, 1917
 Arleux
 Scarpe, 1917, 18
 Hill 70
 Passchendaele
 Amiens
 Drocourt-Quéant
 Hindenburg Line
 Canal du Nord
 Pursuit to Mons
 France and Flanders, 1915-18

Notable Members 

 William Merrifield 
 Oliver Milton Martin

References 

Rifle regiments of Canada
Military units and formations of Ontario
Military units and formations disestablished in 1946